The Thorstein Veblen Farmstead is a National Historic Landmark near Nerstrand in rural Rice County, Minnesota,  United States.  The property is nationally significant as the childhood home of Thorstein B. Veblen (1857-1929), an economist, social scientist, and critic of American culture probably best known for The Theory of the Leisure Class, published in 1899.

Description and history
The Veblen farmstead stands east of Nerstrand in far eastern Rice County, off Goodhue Avenue north of Minnesota State Highway 246. The house, granary, and barn, were all built by Thomas Veblen, in the 1870s and 1880s. The house is a two-story frame structure, with a side gable roof, two chimneys, and clapboard siding. A single-story porch extends across the front, supported by square posts, with a balcony above. The barn is two stories, and has a gabled roof.

Thorstein Veblen, born in Wisconsin in 1857, lived on this farm (homesteaded by his parents) as a youth and returned often as an adult, due in part to his inability to land  a job, despite college degrees. The product of an austere agrarian upbringing, Veblen has often been called one of America's most creative and original thinkers. He coined the term "conspicuous consumption." The property's simple vernacular styling illustrates early influences on Veblen's life as the son of immigrants, growing up in a tightly knit Norwegian-American community. His book, Theory of the Leisure Class is distinguished by economic, social, and literary scholars.

The Veblens sold the property in 1893 and it continued to be an active farm until 1970, when the buildings fell into disrepair.  The house has now been meticulously restored and the Preservation Alliance of Minnesota holds a preservation easement on the property.

See also
List of National Historic Landmarks in Minnesota
National Register of Historic Places listings in Rice County, Minnesota
Washington Island (Wisconsin) § Culture

References

External links
 NHL Summary

Houses in Rice County, Minnesota
Houses completed in 1867
Farms on the National Register of Historic Places in Minnesota
National Historic Landmarks in Minnesota
Norwegian-American history
Norwegian-American culture in Minnesota
National Register of Historic Places in Rice County, Minnesota
1867 establishments in Minnesota
Farmstead, Thorstein Veblen